Marriott Vacation Club is the primary timeshare brand of Marriott Vacations Worldwide Corporation. The brand comprises around 70 Marriott Vacation Club properties throughout the United States, Caribbean, Central America, Europe, and Asia. Marriott Vacation Club resorts consist of one, two, and three-bedroom villas, with more than 400,000 owners.

History

Marriott Ownership Resorts, Inc. was established in 1984 (on April 17) on Hilton Head Island, South Carolina with the acquisition of American Resorts and its 184 villas on Hilton Head Island, which later became the Marriott's Monarch at Sea Pines resort. In 1987, Marriott Rewards (introduced in 1983) started a partnership with the Marriott Ownership Resorts. In 1990, Marriott begins an exchange partnership with Interval International (ILG, Inc.), allowing Owners to trade weeks at their home resort for access to other resort destinations worldwide. In 1995, Marriott Ownership Resorts, Inc. was renamed, becoming Marriott Vacation Club International (MVCI) reflecting the company's evolution from real estate development to vacations. In 1996, Marriott Vacation Club International (MVCI) opened its first European property called Marriott's Marbella Beach Club in Costa del Sol, Spain. In 1997, Marriott Vacation Club International (MVCI) opened its first Caribbean property called Marriott's Aruba Ocean Club in Palm Beach, Aruba. In 1999, Marriott introduced The Ritz-Carlton Club (Ritz-Carlton Destination Club since April 2009), a luxury fractional ownership offering. In 2001, Marriott Vacation Club International (MVCI) opened its first Asia property called Marriott's Phuket Beach Club in Phuket, Thailand. In 2001, the first property of Marriott Grand Residence Club (Grand Residences by Marriott since 2006) opened in South Lake Tahoe. In 2007, Marriott Vacation Club International began to market its core timeshare brand as Marriott Vacation Club.

In 2010, the Marriott Vacation Club Destinations program was introduced. The Destinations program allows owners to redeem Vacation Club Points for stays at Marriott Vacation Club resorts, Marriott hotels, travel packages and resorts through Interval International. The Destinations program differs from traditional timeshare ownership in that owners own "points" rather than fixed or "floating" weeks. Under the Destinations program, each property assigns a "point cost" to each type of room/villa, which usually varies by season, and owners "spend" their points to occupy. 

In November 2011, Marriott Vacation Club was spun off from Marriott International and became a publicly traded company (NYSE: VAC) under the new parent company Marriott Vacations Worldwide, based in Orlando, Florida. Marriott Vacation Club retains a relationship with Marriott, enabling guests to book rooms via the Marriot.com website and retaining integration with the Marriott Bonvoy loyalty program.

In 2016, Marriott Vacation Club introduced the Marriott Vacation Club Pulse brand. These properties, set in urban locations, are designed for shorter stays. The brand launched with locations in New York City, San Diego, South Beach, Washington, DC and Boston.

As of 2018, Marriott Vacation Club is one of 4 brands that includes Marriott Vacation Club Pulse, The Ritz-Carlton Destination Club and Grand Residences by Marriott. There are around 70 Marriott Vacation Club branded resorts throughout the world, including three resorts in Spain (Costa del Sol, Mallorca and Marbella) one in France (near Paris) and three in Thailand (one in Bangkok and two in Phuket). Owners are able to exchange into other locations through the use of Interval International, a timeshare exchange company with over 3,000 resorts. Uniquely, owners may also exchange their ownership week into Marriott Rewards Points which then may be redeemed for stays at Marriott hotel properties or for travel activities such as cruises and guided tours with affiliated partners.

Structure
Originally, Marriott Vacation Club properties were sold as weeks. A "fixed week" granted the owner the right to use their villa during a specific week each year (such as week 52, which includes New Year's Eve), or the right to use their villa during a specific "season" (defined on a per-resort basis), which granted the owner the right to reserve their villa for any available week within that season. Weeks at some properties could be split, enabling a non-consecutive four-night stay and three-night stay. Weeks could be exchanged for Marriott Rewards (now Marriott Bonvoy) points. Finally, owners of multi-room villas, such as a two-bedroom lockoff, could split the unit itself and book each half as a separate reservation. Notably, owners cannot reserve villas at other properties without exchanging them through Interval International (II). "Weeks owners," as they are called, pay annual maintenance fees that cover maintenance and refurbishment at the resort.

The Marriott Vacation Club Destinations program changed this structure. Owners now purchase points at a particular property, which can be "spent" to reserve a villa for a given number of nights during a given season. Villa "pricing," in points, differs based on the size of the unit and the season. Points can also be used to reserve villas at other properties, without having to exchange through II. "Points owners," as they are called, pay annual dues, which cover maintenance and refurbishment, much like maintenance fees for weeks owners.

"Weeks" owners can "enroll" their week(s), for a fee, into the Destinations program, effectively converting their week(s) into points on an annual basis.

Marriott Vacation Club continues to sell weeks at some properties, particularly when they acquire weeks from owners wishing to sell them. Marriott Vacation Club has a contractual "right of first refusal" on all resales. If an owner obtains a purchase agreement for their week(s), Marriott Vacation Club can choose to pay the agreed-upon purchase price to obtain the week(s), effectively cancelling the sale. This approach can have the effect of keeping an owner from selling for below market value, since Marriott Vacation Club can effectively take the week(s) "off the market."

Each Marriott Vacation Club property effectively has up to two inventories of villas. Older properties' inventories consist mainly of "weeks owners." Newer properties' inventories consist mainly of points, wherein all available points are owned by a Marriott Vacation Club-controlled trust, and made available to owners who purchased under the Destinations program. Many properties have inventory of both weeks and points. It is important for owners to understand that these two inventories do not intermingle. For example, suppose an owner purchased 2,000 points at Property A, and wished to occupy a villa at Property B. Property B is an older property that was 100% sold-out as weeks. The owner will probably be unsuccessful, because there is no "points inventory" at Property B from which to fulfill their request. It is important for prospective owners to fully understand the differences between the inventories and to ensure their purchase will afford them the occupancy they desire.

The creation of the Destinations program has been controversial and resulted in lawsuits.

Similar programs
Diamond Resorts International
Disney Vacation Club
Hilton Grand Vacations Company
Westgate Resorts
Bluegreen Corporation

Properties

See also

Time-share

References

External links

Marriott Vacation Club Website
Marriott Vacations Worldwide Careers Site
Club Marriott South Asia

Timeshare chains
Marriott International brands